Itruvone (developmental code name PH10), also known as pregn-4-en-20-yn-3-one, is a vomeropherine which is under development by VistaGen Therapeutics as a nasal spray for the treatment of major depressive disorder.

See also
 List of investigational antidepressants
 List of neurosteroids § Pheromones and pherines

References

Ethynyl compounds
Experimental drugs
Ketones
Pregnanes